Khua kling is a spicy, dry-fried curry from Thai cuisine originating from the Southern Region. The primary components are meat and Southern Thai style red curry paste. Unlike most curries that are cooked in a spicy sauce, the dry meat style directly seasons the meat. When dry-frying the meat its fat renders allowing the curry paste to adhere.

Ingredients
The main ingredient of khua kling can be divided into two parts: curry paste and roast meat. The ingredients of the curry paste are chili, pepper, lemongrass, garlic, turmeric, galangal, salt, and shrimp paste. The ingredients of the roasted meat are kaffir lime, curry paste, and meat such as pork, chicken, and beef.

Cooking
The meat is cleaned and minced.  Prepare a curry paste with chili, pepper, lemongrass, garlic, and lime and then pound the mixture by mortar. Next put the shrimp paste into the mortar for mixing. After that, add the minced meat into the pan, roast over a small flame and during the cooking, use a ladle to stir and protect the meat from sticking to the pan. When the meat is cooked thoroughly, add the curry paste into the pan. If the mix is too dry, you can add a bit of water. Mix the curry and meat together until it is cooked, then add sliced kaffir lime leaves. Taste and check flavors. When you achieve the desired flavor, it is finished and ready to eat.

References

Thai cuisine